Liu Huana (born May 17, 1981 in Shandong) is a female Chinese football (soccer) player who competed at the 2004 Summer Olympics.

In 2004, she was a squad member of the Chinese team which finished ninth in the women's tournament.

International goals

External links
profile

1981 births
Living people
Chinese women's footballers
China women's international footballers
Footballers at the 2004 Summer Olympics
Footballers at the 2008 Summer Olympics
Olympic footballers of China
Footballers from Shandong
Asian Games medalists in football
Footballers at the 2006 Asian Games
Footballers at the 2010 Asian Games
Asian Games bronze medalists for China
Women's association football defenders
Medalists at the 2006 Asian Games
FIFA Century Club